Happy with What You Have to Be Happy With (stylized in lowercase) is the third EP by prog rock band King Crimson released in 2002, a companion to the subsequent album The Power to Believe (2003). Many of the songs on Happy With What You Have to Be Happy With can also be found on The Power to Believe, but there are differences between recordings; this version of "Happy with What You Have to Be Happy With" is longer by one chorus, and "Eyes Wide Open" uses primarily acoustic instrumentation.

Track listing
"Bude" (Adrian Belew) – 0:26
"Happy with What You Have to Be Happy With" (Belew, Robert Fripp, Trey Gunn, Pat Mastelotto) – 4:12
"Mie Gakure" ( Appear and Disappear) (Belew, Fripp) – 2:00
"She Shudders" (Belew) – 0:35
"Eyes Wide Open" (Belew, Fripp, Gunn, Mastelotto) – 4:08
"Shoganai" ( It Can't be Helped) (Belew) – 2:53
"I Ran" (Belew) – 0:40
"Potato Pie" (Belew, Fripp, Gunn, Mastelotto) – 5:03
"Larks' Tongues in Aspic (Part IV)" (Belew, Fripp, Gunn, Mastelotto) – 10:26
Including:
"I Have a Dream"
Recorded live at 328 Performance Hall, Nashville, USA, November 2001
"Clouds" (Belew) – 4:11
 The song "Clouds" ends at 0:30. The hidden track "Einstein's Relatives" starts at 1:00, after 30 seconds of silence.

Personnel
Robert Fripp – guitar
Adrian Belew – guitar, vocals
Trey Gunn – Warr guitar, bass guitar
Pat Mastelotto – drums, electronic percussion

References

2002 EPs
King Crimson EPs
Sanctuary Records EPs